Denial is a book by Richard S. Tedlow that highlights issues within business leadership. The book has two parts. The first portion highlights companies that have struggled to solve matters within their respective businesses while the second part features firms that successfully overcame obstacles. Some of these examples include matters within the Ford Motor Company and their need for product expansion as well as the DuPont Company in Delaware.

The book was published in 2010 by Portfolio and, according to WorldCat, is in 565 libraries.

A Chinese translation was published as 啓動你的面對力 : 為何無法面對現實?如何學會不再逃避? / Qǐdòng nǐ de miàn duì lì: Wèihé wúfǎ miàn duì xiànshí? Rúhé xuéhuì bù zài táobì? 

The book has been excerpted in Business Week upon publication. It was reviewed in Time.

References

Business books